John C. Doerfer (November 30, 1904 – June 5, 1992) served as Chairman of the Federal Communications Commission from July 1, 1957 to March 10, 1960 as a Republican.

Early life 
Prior to his chairmanship of the FCC, Doerfer was the city attorney for West Allis, Wisconsin. He served on Milwaukee Mayor Frank P. Zeidler's Metropolitan Transportation Committee. In 1950, he became chairman of the Public Service Commission of Wisconsin, the state agency that oversees public utilities.

In 1957, Doerfer was appointed to head the Federal Communications Commission by President Dwight Eisenhower. A short time into his term he came under suspicion for accepting trips and other gifts from the broadcasters he was supposed to regulate. The eruption of the 1950s quiz show scandals concerning the rigging of T.V. game show answers that brought widespread criticism for Doerfer and the F.C.C. for their failure to properly police these programs.

In March 1960, an investigation revealed that Doerfer had been a guest on the luxury yacht of George B. Storer, president of Storer Communications. In the wake of these revelations he was asked to resign, which he did on March 14, 1960.

References

Chairmen of the Federal Communications Commission
1904 births
1992 deaths
Eisenhower administration personnel
People from West Allis, Wisconsin